Tequesta is an incorporated village in Palm Beach County, Florida, United States. The population was 6,158 at the 2020 Census. It is the northernmost municipality in the Miami metropolitan area, which in 2010 had a total population of 5,564,635 according to the U.S. Census.

History

Tequesta was founded in the 1950s as a planned community centered on the Tequesta Country Club. Tequesta was named after the Tequesta people. The village was incorporated in 1957.

Geography

The Village of Tequesta is located at  (26.960867, –80.096620).

According to the United States Census Bureau, the village has a total area of 2.2 square miles (5.7 km), of which  1.8 square miles (4.5 km) is land and 0.5 square mile (1.2 km) (20.81%) is water.

Most of the village is located on the mainland but parts of the village are on Jupiter Island in Martin County, with small sections both north and south of the unincorporated, county-owned Coral Cove Park.

Demographics

2020 census

As of the 2020 United States census, there were 6,158 people, 2,684 households, and 1,653 families residing in the village. There were 2,684 households, out of which 22.8% had children under the age of 18 living with them, 55.7% were married couples living together, 7.0% had a female householder with no husband present, and 35.1% were non-families. 29.5% of all households were made up of individuals, and 17.8% had someone living alone who was 65 years of age or older. The average household size was 2.22 and the average family size was 2.75.

In the village, the population was spread out, with 19.1% under the age of 18, 4.0% from 18 to 24, 22.9% from 25 to 44, 27.1% from 45 to 64, and 26.9% who were 65 years of age or older.  The median age was 48 years. For every 100 females, there were 89.3 males.  For every 100 females age 18 and over, there were 83.3 males.

The median income for a household in the village was $58,825, and the median income for a family was $72,683. Males had a median income of $51,563 versus $31,855 for females. The per capita income for the village was $34,974.  About 1.6% of families and 3.2% of the population were below the poverty line, including none of those under age 18 and 6.8% of those age 65 or over.

Notable people

 Ryan Berube, Olympic swimming gold medalist, 1996 4 × 200 m freestyle
 Mark Calcavecchia, PGA Tour golfer
 Keith Hernandez, Major League Baseball player, 1979 National League co-MVP
 Steve Marino, PGA Tour golfer
 Joe Namath, Pro Football Hall of Fame quarterback
 Jo Ann Pflug, film and TV actress
 Burt Reynolds, actor
 Tom Rooney, Representative from Florida's 17th congressional district
 Scott Sharp, auto racer, 2001 Indianapolis 500 pole winner, 14-time Indianapolis 500 starter, 1996 Indy Racing League champion and Rolex 24 Hours at Daytona 2-time champion
 Bob Shaw, Major League Baseball player, pitched in 1959 World Series for the Chicago White Sox

Churches

Mary, Mother of the Light Maronite Catholic Church
St Jude Catholic Church
First Presbyterian Church of Tequesta-Jupiter
The Church of the Good Shepherd
Jupiter-Tequesta Church of Christ, Martin County
Tequesta's First Baptist Church

Education

The Village of Tequesta has one private Christian elementary school: Good Shepherd Episcopal School (PreK–6); and two Christian preschools: Christ the King Lutheran Preschool, and First Presbyterian Preschool. Residents living in the Village of Tequesta who wish to attend public school in Palm Beach County are zoned for schools in the town of Jupiter, including Limestone Creek Elementary, Jupiter Elementary, Jupiter Middle School, and Jupiter Community High School. Those who live in Martin County are zoned for Hobe Sound Elementary, Murray Middle School, and South Fork High School.

Emergency Services

Fire Rescue

The Tequesta Fire Rescue department provides fire protection and emergency medical services to the citizens of the village. They operate from Station 85, located in the village's Public Safety Facility (Engine 85, Engine 285, Truck 85, Rescue 85, Rescue 285).

Law Enforcement

The Tequesta Police Department consists of approximately 20 sworn officers, and is headquartered in the village's Public Safety Facility.

Media

Tequesta is the city of license for West Palm Beach's ABC affiliate, WPBF. While WPBF and the rest of West Palm Beach's television stations serve Tequesta, WPBF has no physical presence in the village.

Gallery

References

External links

Village of Tequesta official website
Coral Cove Park website

Villages in Palm Beach County, Florida
Villages in Florida
Populated coastal places in Florida on the Atlantic Ocean